Cape Elizabeth ("Gaoto-misaki") is a cape on the Schmidt Peninsula. It is the northernmost point of Sakhalin.

Cape Elizabeth was named by Adam Johann von Krusenstern (aka Ivan Kruzenstern) in 1805 after Empress Elizaveta, wife of Alexander I of Russia.

The cape is a territory under administration of the Okhinsky District and was the northernmost point of Japan until 1875.

History

Between 1848 and 1874, American whaleships caught bowhead whales off the cape. They also went ashore to obtain wood.

See also
Cape Crillon

References

External links
 Sakhalin Lighthouses (Маяки Сахалина) 

Elisabeth